Maik Ferreira dos Santos (born 6 September 1980) is a Brazilian handball goalkeeper for Al-Rayan and the Brazilian handball team.

He won a gold medal at the 2015 Pan American Games and competed at the Summer Olympics in 2008 and 2016 and at the world championships in 2003, 2007 and 2009.

His elder brother Marcos Paulo Santos and wife Lucila Vianna da Silva are also Olympic handball players, while his daughter wishes to become one.

Titles
Pan American Men's Club Handball Championship:
2011, 
2013, 
2014, 2015, 2016, 2018
South and Central American Men's Club Handball Championship:2019, 2022''

Individual awards and achievements
Best Goalkeeper
2015 Pan American Men's Club Handball Championship
2016 Pan American Men's Club Handball Championship

References

1980 births
Living people
Brazilian male handball players
Olympic handball players of Brazil
Handball players at the 2008 Summer Olympics
Handball players at the 2016 Summer Olympics
Handball players at the 2011 Pan American Games
Handball players at the 2015 Pan American Games
Handball players at the 2007 Pan American Games
Pan American Games medalists in handball
Pan American Games gold medalists for Brazil
Pan American Games silver medalists for Brazil
Handball players from São Paulo
Medalists at the 2007 Pan American Games
Medalists at the 2011 Pan American Games
Medalists at the 2015 Pan American Games